Francis Baylies (October 16, 1783 – October 28, 1852) was a U.S. Representative from Massachusetts, and brother of congressman William Baylies. His great-grandfather was Thomas Baylies, an ironmaster from Coalbrookdale, England, who immigrated to Boston in 1737.

Baylies was born in Taunton, Massachusetts, in 1783, the son of Dr. William Baylies (1742–1826). He studied law, and was admitted to the bar in 1810 and commenced practice in Taunton, Massachusetts. He later served as Register of Probate for Bristol County 1812–1820. He was an unsuccessful candidate for election in 1818 to the Sixteenth Congress.

Baylies was elected as a Federalist to the Seventeenth Congress, a Jackson Federalist to the Eighteenth Congress, and a Jacksonian to the Nineteenth Congress (March 4, 1821 – March 3, 1827).
He was an unsuccessful candidate in 1827 for reelection to the Twentieth Congress.
He served as member of the Massachusetts House of Representatives from 1827 to 1832.

Jackson then appointed him to the post of United States chargé d'affaires in Buenos Aires in the Argentine Confederation following the raid on the Falkland Islands by USS Lexington in 1831. USS Peacock conveyed Mr. Baylies and family to la Plata and on the occasion, both the British line-of-battle ship Plantagenet and frigate Druid complemented her flag by playing Hail, Columbia. His very short term in office was due to the unsettled conditions of the time.

Baylies was again elected to the Massachusetts House of Representatives in 1835. He engaged in literary pursuits. He died in Taunton, Massachusetts, October 28, 1852, and was interred in the Old Plain Cemetery.

Writings
 An Historical Memoir of the Colony of New Plymouth (1830).
 Massachusetts Historical Society,  Letters of Francis Baylies 1827–1834. in Proceedings of the Massachusetts Historical Society. vol. 45, Pages 166 -184, (1912).

References

 Emery, Samuel Hopkins.: Ministry of Taunton v. 1 p. 253, (1853).

 

 
 
 

1783 births
1852 deaths
Politicians from Taunton, Massachusetts
American people of English descent
Federalist Party members of the United States House of Representatives from Massachusetts
Jacksonian members of the United States House of Representatives from Massachusetts
Members of the Massachusetts House of Representatives
19th-century American diplomats
19th-century American politicians
American lawyers